A dud is an ammunition round or explosive that fails to fire or detonate, respectively, on time or on command. Poorly designed devices (for example, improvised explosive devices (IEDs)), and small devices, have higher chances of being duds.

Duds are still dangerous, and can explode if handled. They have to be deactivated and disposed of carefully. In war-torn areas, many curious children have been injured or killed from tampering with such devices.

The term descends from the Middle English dudde, originally meaning worn-out or ragged clothing, and is a cognate of duds (i.e., "clothing") and dowdy.  Eventually dud became a general pejorative for something useless, including ammunition.

The variation absolute dud describes a nuclear weapon that fails to explode. (A nuclear weapon which does explode, but does not achieve its expected power, is termed a fizzle.)

By extension, "dud" has become a slang word for anything that does not work or is defective.

Other meanings
Generally your duds are "your last possessions", what you are wearing and carrying, so nice duds is ironic and possibly an oxymoron. Other meanings of 'dud' are:
 Duds - 16th century term for "clothes". 
 Dud - 17th century term for "worthless". Then 17th Century term for "old clothes" and "rags".
 Duddery - 17th-19th century term for a "clothier's booth", trading in old cloth and rags.
 To sweat your duds - 19th century term for "to pawn one's clothes"
 Dudman - "Scarecrow!", possibly from Dutch Dood/dode man (dead man), or from the old clothes used to clothe a scarecrow.
 'Dud' is also used to describe a person who failed to meet standards in relationships.

See also

Bomb disposal
Firearm malfunction
Unexploded ordnance

References

Ammunition